Brule Lake forms part of the border between the states of Michigan and Wisconsin and is the headwater of the Brule River at .

See also
List of lakes in Michigan

References

Borders of Michigan
Borders of Wisconsin
Lakes of Forest County, Wisconsin
Bodies of water of Iron County, Michigan
Lakes of Michigan